Sachin Shroff (born 17 December) is an Indian television and film actor.

He played Gyan in Har Ghar Kuch Kehta Hai and Arjun in Naaginn. Other appearances include Sinndoor Tere Naam Ka, Saat Phere: Saloni Ka Safar, Naam Gum Jayegaa, Shagun, Vishwaas and Taarak Mehta Ka Ooltah Chashmah.

Personal life

Sachin Shroff married television actress Juhi Parmar on 15 February 2009 at a palace in Jaipur. The couple have a daughter, Samaira Shroff, born on 27 January 2013.

In early January 2018, Parmar confirmed that they had filed for divorce, which was finalised in July 2018. Parmar was granted custody of their daughter.

He married Chandani Kothi on 25 February 2023.

Filmography

Television

References

External links
 
 

Living people
Indian male television actors
Actors from Mumbai
1972 births